Active Minds is a nonprofit organization dedicated to promoting mental health, especially among young adults, via peer-to-peer dialogue and interaction. Active Minds was founded by Alison Malmon in 2003, after her older brother died by suicide in 2000. Alison recognized that Brian’s story is the story of thousands of young people who suffer in silence; who, despite their large numbers, think they are totally alone. A majority of mental health issues start between ages fourteen and twenty-four, when teens and young adults are in school, and suicide is the second leading cause for youth and young adults. 

In addition to 600 national chapters empowering passionate student advocates, Active Minds’ programs include Send Silence Packing®, an award-winning suicide prevention exhibit; Active Minds Speakers, a curated group of professional storytellers and presenters who provide encouraging and safe mental health education for students and other audiences; the Healthy Campus Award, which honors colleges that are prioritizing student health and well-being; and Active Minds @Work, which works to build a mental health culture in the workplace.  

The Active Minds message, amplified by thousands of young adults each year, is that "...mental health needs to be talked about as easily as physical health. Only then can we bring suicide and mental health into the open so no one struggles alone."

History

Alison Malmon launched the first student-led chapter of what would become Active Minds in her junior year at the University of Pennsylvania, after her older brother, Brian, died by suicide. Brian Malmon was a successful student at Columbia University: he was a member of the Dean's list, and was a leader in many extracurricular activities. However, he was suffering from what was later diagnosed as schizoaffective disorder, and was keeping those feelings to himself. After his death, many friends claimed that they had noticed changes in Brian, but were not sure what to say or how to approach the situation, and therefore did nothing. This silence and lack of awareness is what prompted Malmon to start Active Minds.

The organization, originally called "Open Minds", was dedicated to increasing awareness about mental illness. In 2003, when Malmon graduated, she launched Active Minds, Inc as a 501(c)(3) organization. She became the youngest person to receive the Tipper Gore Remember the Children Award from the National Mental Health Association.

Active Minds has since become the premier organization impacting young adults and mental health. Now on more than 600 campuses, they directly reach close to 1.8 million people each year through campus awareness campaigns, events, advocacy, outreach, and more.

National programs
Active Minds primarily operates through peer-to-peer methods, supported by their robust chapter network in high schools, colleges, and universities. Additionally, they also provide various nationwide programs for students, workplace professionals, and organizations of any size.

National Chapter Network 
Active Minds is powered by more than 600 student-led chapters, both across the United States and internationally. Each year, thousands of students join an Active Minds chapter as passionate advocates, stigma fighters, and educators for mental health.

Campus Policy Change 
Transform Your Campus® is an Active Minds program for student leaders featuring guides on how to implement advocacy campaigns on campuses. Current campaign initiatives include adding mental health crisis numbers to student IDs, improving campus leave of absence policies, and reducing the rate of deaths by suicide by limiting access to fatal methods.

K-12 Initiatives 
Active Minds K-12 initiatives aim to mobilize and empower youth and young adults to change the conversation about mental health and engage in proven peer-to-peer approaches in their schools. These initiatives include the Active Minds Mental Health Advocacy Academy, the Your Voice is Your Power campaign, and K-12-specific mental health resources.

National Conference 
Presented since 2004, this highly anticipated annual event brings together hundreds of young adults and mental health leaders; campus and school professionals; government, foundation, and corporate representatives from across the country to share ideas and advance knowledge about mental health education, advocacy, and awareness.

The conference annually showcases the most innovative and effective approaches to supporting young adult well-being and changing the conversation about mental health on campuses, in workplaces, and within our communities.

Send Silence Packing 
In 2008, Active Minds held the first Send Silence Packing display at the National Mall in Washington DC. The display consists of 1,000 backpacks laid on the ground in a public space, with personal stories attached.  These backpacks represent the lives of the over 1,000 college students that are lost to suicide each year. The Send Silence Packing tour now travels nationwide in the fall and spring of each year.

Active Minds Speakers 
Active Minds has over a dozen speakers available for presentations at schools, workplaces, community events, and more. The speakers are able to present on a variety of topics, including mental illness, workplace mental health, and suicide prevention.

Active Minds @Work 
Active Minds @Work offers simple and actionable tools for the next generation of employees and employers, designed to improve the culture of mental health in high-performing environments.

Other initiatives and awards

Emerging Scholars Fellowship 
The Active Minds Emerging Scholars Fellowship, generously supported by the Scattergood Foundation for Behavioral Health and Avi and Sandra Nash, provides an opportunity for students to complete funded, independent mental health projects and to be connected with a network of young scholars and national experts in the field of behavioral health.

Healthy Campus Award 
The Active Minds Healthy Campus Award recognizes and celebrates U.S. colleges and universities that are prioritizing health and making significant progress toward creating a campus that promotes mental health, physical health, and well-being of its students. The award was established in 2016 and is supported by Peg's Foundation.

Impact studies

Active Minds' Student Mental Health Survey 
Following Active Minds' spring 2020 survey (The Impact of COVID-19 on Student Mental Health), another survey was conducted to see the ways that COVID-19 had impacted students’ mental health six months later. Active Minds surveyed over 2,000 students during fall 2020 to better understand the continued toll of the pandemic on students. Two thirds of students (66.89%) reported an increase in supporting others with their mental wellness. Respondents reported having received information from their institution regarding mental health (66.41%), academic policies (82.5%), and healthy coping strategies (49.15%).

The Impact of COVID-19 on Student Mental Health 
Active Minds surveyed 3,239 high school and higher education students between April 10-18, 2020 regarding the impact of COVID-19 on their mental health. It was found that 80% of college students report that COVID-19 has negatively impacted their mental health. Additionally, research revealed that Despite COVID-19, 79% of college students feel hopeful about achieving their school-related goals and their future job prospects.

RAND Impact Study 
A study done across 12 California colleges found that increased awareness of Active Minds led to an increase in perceived knowledge about mental health related issues and in helping behaviors. It also led to a decrease in stigma. This study had limitations, however, as it was done on a convenience sample, so the students involved may have been more involved in Active Minds than an average student.

Healthy Minds Study 
Another study included 70,000 students at colleges that participated in a Healthy Minds Survey. In this study, Active Minds was found to lower the stigma felt (both on a personal and public level), increase knowledge about resources and services, improve attitudes toward medications, and lower levels of depression and anxiety. The study did suggest, however, that Active Minds may not have an increasing effect on already positive mental health. This study was limited by its large sample size, which made significant results more likely.

References

External links

 

Mental health organizations in Washington, D.C.
Organizations established in 2003
Suicide prevention
Advocacy groups in the United States